These are the official results of the Women's Pole Vault event at the 2005 World Championships in Helsinki, Finland, held on August 7 and August 12, 2005.

Medalists

Schedule
All times are Eastern European Time (UTC+2)

Records

Results

Qualification
Group A
1.  Anna Rogowska, Poland 4.45m Q
2.  Jillian Schwartz, United States 4.45m Q
2.  Tatyana Polnova, Russia 4.45m Q
4.  Caroline Hingst, Germany 4.45m Q
5.  Vanessa Boslak, France 4.40m q
6.  Tracy O'Hara, United States 4.40m q
6.  Naroa Agirre, Spain 4.40m q (SB)
8.  Janine Whitlock, Great Britain 4.40m
9.  Thórey Edda Elisdóttir, Iceland 4.15m
9.  Takayo Kondo, Japan 4.15m
9.  Kirsten Belin, Sweden 4.15m
12.  Melina Hamilton, New Zealand 4.15m
13.  Natalya Kushch, Ukraine 4.15m
14.  Kelsey Hendry, Canada 4.00m
14.  Zhao Yingying, China 4.00m

Group B
1.  Monika Pyrek, Poland 4.45m Q
1.  Yelena Isinbayeva, Russia 4.45m Q
3.  Gao Shuying, China 4.45m Q (SB)
4.  Dana Ellis, Canada 4.40m q
4.  Pavla Hamáčková, Czech Republic 4.40m q
6.  Tatiana Grigorieva, Australia 4.45m q
7.  Fabiana Murer, Brazil 4.40m (NR)
8.  Stacy Dragila, United States 4.40m
9.  Anzhela Balakhonova, Ukraine 4.15m
9.  Krisztina Molnár, Hungary 4.15m
9.  Afroditi Skafida, Greece 4.15 m
12.  Elisabete Tavares, Portugal 4.00m
13.  Teja Melink, Slovenia 4.00m
 Anna Fitidou, Cyprus NM
 Nadine Rohr, Switzerland NM

Final

External links
IAAF results, heats
IAAF results, final

Pole vault
Pole vault at the World Athletics Championships
2005 in women's athletics